Victor Jose Mata Abreu (born June 17, 1961 in Santiago, Dominican Republic) is a retired Major League Baseball outfielder. He played during two seasons at the major league level for the New York Yankees. Currently works for the New York Yankees as a supervisor of scouting operations in Dominican Republic, has been instrumental for the signing of big league players as Robinson Cano, Eduardo Nunez, Cristian Guzman, D'Angelo Jimenez, Jose Tabata, Francisco Cervelli among many others.

References

External links

1961 births
Living people
Águilas Cibaeñas players
Columbus Clippers players
Dominican Republic expatriate baseball players in Mexico
Dominican Republic expatriate baseball players in the United States
Greensboro Hornets players

Major League Baseball outfielders
Major League Baseball players from the Dominican Republic
Mexican League baseball players
Nashville Sounds players
New York Yankees players
New York Yankees scouts
Oneonta Yankees players
Rochester Red Wings players
Saraperos de Saltillo players